Kelokedara is a village in the Paphos District of Cyprus, located 6 km southwest of Salamiou.

References

Communities in Paphos District